Christine Petit (born 28 January 1955) is a French former freestyle swimmer. She competed in the women's 4 × 100 metre freestyle relay at the 1972 Summer Olympics.

References

External links
 

1955 births
Living people
French female freestyle swimmers
Olympic swimmers of France
Swimmers at the 1972 Summer Olympics
Place of birth missing (living people)